Monte dei Frati is a mountain in the Italian province of Arezzo near the border with Pesaro e Urbino and Perugia.

Geography 
It is on the border between the Umbrian Apennines and the Umbrian-Marchean Apennines. It is near the sources of the Marecchia and Metauro rivers. The Tiber flows near the western side of the mountain.

References

Mountains of Tuscany
Mountains of the Apennines